Holy Moses was an American rock band based in Woodstock, New York. They released one album on RCA Victor Records in 1971.

Background 
The roots of the band lie in the country rock band Kangaroo, which formed in 1968 around folk singer Barbara Keith, multi-instrumentalist John Hall, guitarist Teddy Speleos, and drummer/vocalist N. D. Smart (previously of the Remains).  Speleos (born Theodore Edward Speleos, 1951) was a virtuoso guitarist who had previously replaced Roy Buchanan, and played with Hall, in rock and roll band the British Walkers, and whose style was sometimes compared with Jimi Hendrix.  In his autobiography Born To Run, Bruce Springsteen wrote that he and Steve Van Zant used to see Speleos playing in bands in Greenwich Village, and used to "sit there slack-jawed at his sound, technique and nonchalance... ". The group, Kangaroo, came to be based in Washington, D.C., and developed an enthusiastic live following.  They released a self-titled album on MGM Records.  Reviewer Richie Unterberger said of the album that "there are few other albums of the late '60s...  on which so much talent is evident, but so little coheres into satisfying results."  The band split up in early 1969.  Hall moved on to form the band Orleans before becoming a politician; Smart later formed Mountain with Leslie West; and Keith began a solo career.

Formation and career 
Speleos then formed a new band, Holy Moses, in Woodstock, New York, with David Vittek (rhythm guitar), Marty David (bass, tenor sax), and Chris Parker (drums).  They were joined by singer,  songwriter and pianist Billy Batson, a California native who had recorded for Decca Records in 1966, performed in clubs in California and Greenwich Village, and had several of his songs recorded by duo Hedge and Donna.   Batson's songs gave a new focus to the band, and they performed regularly in the Catskills.  They rejected a management offer by Albert Grossman, but were seen by Michael Jeffery, who was looking for a new band to manage after the death of his client, Jimi Hendrix.  Jeffery was impressed by Speleos' guitar style, and gave him one of Hendrix's guitars.  The band won a contract with RCA Victor, and in 1970 recorded their album, Holy Moses!!, at the Electric Lady Studios in New York City.  All the songs were written by Batson, and the album was produced by Mike Esposito of the Blues Magoos and Kim King of Lothar and the Hand People.

Released in 1971, together with a single, "A Cowboy's Dream", the album failed to chart, despite having "all the ingredients of a bonafide classic".  Esposito later described the band as "unusually unstable".   Jeffery was killed in an airplane crash in 1973; some of the band's equipment including Speleos' guitars were stolen; and Speleos, who reportedly had problems of mental health, moved back to Virginia to start a family.  The band then split up.

Later activities 
Parker joined Paul Butterfield's Better Days; Speleos reportedly later spent some time in a monastery;  Marty David became a session musician. Batson was later a member of The Hypstrz, with Ernest Batson, Randy Weiss, and John Haga.  They released an album, Hypstrization!, on Voxx Records in 1980.

David Vittek died in 2012.  Billy Batson died from lung cancer on September 5, 2017.

References

External links 
  Ted Speleos at Facebook

Musical groups established in 1968
Rock music groups from New York (state)
American country rock groups
Musical groups disestablished in 1973